Cathy Johnston-Forbes ( Johnston; born December 16, 1963) is an American professional golfer.

She was born in High Point, North Carolina and attended the University of North Carolina.

Professional career
Johnston's rookie season on the LPGA Tour was 1986. Her only victory on the tour came in 1990 at one of the LPGA majors, the du Maurier Classic. She had her best finish on the money list that same year, placing 21st.

In 1997, Johnston-Forbes tied for second in the Susan G. Komen International and posted her career low score of 64 during the second round of the Welch's/Circle K Championship. Along with her second-place finish in the Susan B. Komen International, she has posted two additional runner-up finishes on the LPGA tour. In 2000, she tied for fourth at the Nabisco Championship and crossed the $1 million mark in career earnings after the Giant Eagle LPGA Classic.

During her 23-year professional career, Johnston-Forbes has worked with some of the most respected golf instructors in the world. Her teachers have included Golf Magazine Top 100 Teachers Chuck Cook, Mike McGetrick, Tom Patri, and short game guru Dave Pelz. In addition, she has worked with five time Top Teachers in Pennsylvania award winner, Bob Kramer and Kirk Lucas, and longtime Carolinas PGA Section Professional, Jerry McGraw.

Professional wins

LPGA Tour wins (1)

Major championships

Wins (1)

References

External links

American female golfers
LPGA Tour golfers
Winners of LPGA major golf championships
Golfers from North Carolina
Sportspeople from High Point, North Carolina
1963 births
Living people
21st-century American women